Cássia Maria Oliveira Linhares (born November 24, 1973, in Niterói) is a Brazilian television actress, best known for her role as Alice in Malhação (1998) and Lulu in Uga-Uga (2000).

In 2011, she acted in Rebelde as Sílvia Campos Sales.

She is married to businessman Renato Bussière, and both are parents of Eduarda and Antonio.

Career

Television

Films

References

External links
 
 

1973 births
Brazilian telenovela actresses
Living people
People from Niterói
Brazilian film actresses